Alireza Ramezani (born 3 June 1993) is an Iranian football midfielder, who currently plays for an Iranian club, Niroo Zamini.

Club career

Moghavemat Tehran
He joined Moghavemat Tehran in the summer of 2011. He played three seasons for the Moghavemat youth team.

Naft Gachsaran
In winter 2013, Ramezani joined Naft Gachsaran. He played his first match for Naft Gachsaran in the 2013–14 season.

Esteghlal
He played half seasons for Naft Gachsaran and moved to Esteghlal in the summer of 2014. He officially joined Esteghlal on 29 June 2014 with a three-year contract and made his debut for his new team in a 1–0 win over Esteghlal Khuzestan, coming as a substitute for Arash Borhani in the 68th minute, during which he assisted Sajjad Shahbazzadeh to score the winning goal.

Club Career Statistics
Last Update: 25 June 2016 

Assists

International career

U20 
He played thirteen matches from 2011 to 2013 for Iran national under-20 football team.

U22 
After Incheon 2014 Games he invited to Iran U-22 training camp by Nelo Vingada.

References

External links
 Alireza Ramezani at FFIRI

Living people
1993 births
People from Abhar
Iranian footballers
Esteghlal F.C. players
Tractor S.C. players
Association football forwards
Association football midfielders